A Moça Que Veio de Longe (English: The Girl From Far Away) is a 1964 Brazilian telenovela written by Ivani Ribeiro, based on the novel by Abel Santa Cruz.

Cast 
Rosamaria Murtinho.... Maria Aparecida
Hélio Souto.... Raul
Flora Geny.... Teresa
Lourdes Rocha.... Miriam
Sílvio Francisco.... Pedro
Neuza Amaral.... Regina
Lourdinha Félix.... Lenita
Maria Aparecida Báxter....
Renato Master.... Henrique
Wilma de Aguiar.... Conceição
Ivan Mesquita.... Nesto

References

External links
 A Moça Que Veio de Longe at IMDb

1964 telenovelas
Brazilian telenovelas
1964 Brazilian television series debuts
1964 Brazilian television series endings
Television shows based on Brazilian novels